Euphlyctinides laika is a species of moth of the family Limacodidae. It is found in Vietnam.

References 
 , 2009: The Limacodidae of Vietnam. Entomofauna Supplement 16: 33-229.

External links 
 The Barcode of Life Data Systems (BOLD)

Limacodidae
Moths described in 2009
Moths of Asia